Fall of the Plastic Empire is the debut album by the American hard rock band Burning Brides. It was released on April 17, 2001, on File Thirteen Records. The next year, it was re-released on V2 with a new cover.  The V2 version is viewable to the right.

Track listing

Personnel 

 Dimitri Coats - electric guitar, vocals
 Melanie Coats - bass
 Mike Ambs - drums

References 

2001 debut albums
V2 Records albums
Burning Brides albums
Albums produced by Dimitri Coats